Serbia competed at the 2018 Mediterranean Games in Tarragona, Catalonia, Spain over 10 days from 22 June to 1 July 2018.

Medalists

Archery 

Men

Athletics 

Men
Track & road events

Women
Track & road events

Field events

Badminton 

Men

Basketball 3x3

Beach volleyball

Bowls 

Lyonnaise

Boxing 

Men

Canoeing 

Men

Women

Legend: FA = Qualify to final (medal); FB = Qualify to final B (non-medal)

Cycling 

Men

Women

Fencing 

Women

Golf

Gymnastics

Artistic gymnastics
Men

Women

Apparatus

Rhythmic gymnastics

Handball

Men's tournament
Roster

Aleksandar Milenković
Dejan Milosavljev
Viktor Matičić
Stevan Sretenović
Darko Stevanović
Milan Vučković
Aleksandar Babić
Nemanja Gojković
Borivoje Đukić
Milan Milić
Predrag Vejin
Nemanja Živković
Mladen Šotić
Vukašin Vorkapić
Vladimir Jevtić
Nemanja Ratković

Group stage

Quarterfinals

5–8th place semifinals

Seventh place game

Women's tournament
Roster

Marijana Ilić
Katarina Kosanović
Dijana Radojević
Milica Rančić
Marija Obradović
Katarina Stošić
Gordana Mitrović
Tamara Radojević
Aleksandra Vukajlović
Lidija Cvijić
Anđela Janjušević
Jelena Terzić
Nataša Atanasković
Jovana Bogojević
Jelena Agbaba
Jovana Milojević

Group stage

Seventh place game

Judo 

Men

Women

Karate 

Men

Women

Rowing 

Men

Sailing 

Women

Shooting 

Men

Women

Swimming 

Men

Women

Table tennis 

Women

Taekwondo 

Men

Women

Triathlon 

Men

Water polo

Men's tournament
Roster

Milan Aleksić
Miloš Ćuk
Filip Filipović
Nikola Jakšić
Dušan Mandić
Branislav Mitrović
Stefan Mitrović
Duško Pijetlović
Gojko Pijetlović
Sava Ranđelović
Strahinja Rašović
Viktor Rašović
Nemanja Ubović

Group stage

Final

Water skiing 

Men

Weightlifting 

Men

Wrestling 

Freestyle wrestling

Greco-Roman wrestling

References

Nations at the 2018 Mediterranean Games
2018
Mediterranean Games